The 1992–93 NBA season was the 23rd season of the National Basketball Association in Cleveland, Ohio. During the off-season, the Cavaliers signed free agent Gerald Wilkins, and then traded Steve Kerr to the Orlando Magic during the first month of the regular season. The Cavaliers struggled with an 8–11 start, but then went on a 7-game winning streak afterwards in December. The Cavs also had a 12–1 record in February, held a 34–19 record at the All-Star break, then posted a ten-game winning streak in April, finishing 2nd in the Central Division with a 54–28 record.

Brad Daugherty led the team averaging 20.2 points and 10.2 rebounds per game, while Mark Price averaged 18.2 points and led the team with 8.0 assists per game, and was named to the All-NBA First Team, and Larry Nance averaged 16.5 points, 8.7 rebounds and 2.6 blocks per game, and was named to the NBA All-Defensive Second Team. In addition, Craig Ehlo provided the team with 11.6 points per game, while Wilkins contributed 11.1 points per game, and sixth man Hot Rod Williams provided with 11.0 points, 6.2 rebounds and 1.6 blocks per game off the bench. Daugherty, Price and Nance were all selected for the 1993 NBA All-Star Game. Price also finished tied in eighth place in Most Valuable Player voting, and won the Three-Point Shootout during the All-Star Weekend in Salt Lake City.

In the Eastern Conference First Round, the Cavaliers defeated the New Jersey Nets in five games, but were swept in four straight games by the Chicago Bulls in the Eastern Conference Semi-finals. The Bulls would go on to defeat the Phoenix Suns in six games in the NBA Finals, winning their third consecutive championship. Following the season, head coach Lenny Wilkens resigned and took a coaching job with the Atlanta Hawks, while Ehlo signed as a free agent with the Hawks, and Mike Sanders retired.

A forgotten highlight of this season is when the Cavaliers set a franchise record by scoring 83 points in a half. On January 15, 1993, the visiting Cavs trailed the Indiana Pacers 64–49. Behind 17 points in 21 minutes by reserve guard John Battle, Cleveland rallied to win 132–120.

Draft picks

The Cavaliers had no draft picks in 1992.

Roster

Regular season

Season standings

y – clinched division title
x – clinched playoff spot

z – clinched division title
y – clinched division title
x – clinched playoff spot

Record vs. opponents

Game log

|-style="background:#fcc;"
| 1 || November 6, 1992 || Chicago
|-style="background:#cfc;"
| 2 || November 8, 1992 || Charlotte
|-style="background:#cfc;"
| 3 || November 10, 1992 || Washington
|-style="background:#cfc;"
| 4 || November 12, 1992 || @ Golden State
|-style="background:#fcc;"
| 5 || November 13, 1992 || @ Portland
|-style="background:#fcc;"
| 6 || November 15, 1992 || @ Sacramento
|-style="background:#fcc;"
| 7 || November 17, 1992 || @ San Antonio
|-style="background:#fcc;"
| 8 || November 19, 1992 || @ Houston
|-style="background:#cfc;"
| 9 || November 21, 1992 || @ Dallas
|-style="background:#cfc;"
| 10 || November 24, 1992 || Milwaukee
|-style="background:#fcc;"
| 11 || November 25, 1992 || @ Milwaukee
|-style="background:#cfc;"
| 12 || November 27, 19927:30 pm EST || Atlanta
| W 122–101
| Price,Wilkins (20)
| Nance (14)
| Price (7)
| Richfield Coliseum20,273
| 6–6
|-style="background:#fcc;"
| 13 || November 28, 1992 || @ Orlando

|-style="background:#cfc;"
| 14 || December 1, 1992 || Boston
|-style="background:#cfc;"
| 15 || December 3, 1992 || New York
|-style="background:#fcc;"
| 16 || December 5, 1992 || Portland
|-style="background:#fcc;"
| 17 || December 8, 1992 || L.A. Clippers
|-style="background:#fcc;"
| 18 || December 9, 1992 || @ Chicago
|-style="background:#fcc;"
| 19 || December 11, 1992 || @ Detroit
|-style="background:#cfc;"
| 20 || December 12, 1992 || Seattle
|-style="background:#cfc;"
| 21 || December 15, 1992 || Houston
|-style="background:#cfc;"
| 22 || December 16, 1992 || @ Philadelphia
|-style="background:#cfc;"
| 23 || December 18, 1992 || Sacramento
|-style="background:#cfc;"
| 24 || December 19, 1992 || Utah
|-style="background:#cfc;"
| 25 || December 21, 1992 || @ Washington
|-style="background:#cfc;"
| 26 || December 23, 1992 || Indiana
|-style="background:#fcc;"
| 27 || December 26, 1992 || New Jersey
|-style="background:#cfc;"
| 28 || December 28, 1992 || Detroit
|-style="background:#cfc;"
| 29 || December 29, 19927:30 pm EST || @ Atlanta
| W 114–96
| Daugherty,Nance (22)
| Daugherty (13)
| Price (7)
| The Omni10,703
| 17–12

|-style="background:#cfc;"
| 30 || January 2, 1993 || L.A. Lakers
|-style="background:#fcc;"
| 31 || January 5, 1993 || @ New York
|-style="background:#cfc;"
| 32 || January 6, 1993 || Chicago
|-style="background:#cfc;"
| 33 || January 9, 1993 || Minnesota
|-style="background:#fcc;"
| 34 || January 12, 1993 || Boston
|-style="background:#fcc;"
| 35 || January 13, 1993 || @ New Jersey
|-style="background:#cfc;"
| 36 || January 15, 1993 || @ Indiana
|-style="background:#cfc;"
| 37 || January 16, 19937:30 pm EST || Atlanta
| W 127–99
| Nance (20)
| Nance (14)
| Brandon (9)
| Richfield Coliseum20,273
| 22–15
|-style="background:#cfc;"
| 38 || January 20, 1993 || Phoenix
|-style="background:#cfc;"
| 39 || January 22, 1993 || @ L.A. Clippers
|-style="background:#fcc;"
| 40 || January 23, 1993 || @ Denver
|-style="background:#fcc;"
| 41 || January 26, 1993 || @ Utah
|-style="background:#cfc;"
| 42 || January 28, 1993 || Orlando
|-style="background:#fcc;"
| 43 || January 30, 1993 || @ Miami

|-style="background:#cfc;"
| 44 || February 2, 1993 || Golden State
|-style="background:#cfc;"
| 45 || February 3, 1993 || @ Milwaukee
|-style="background:#cfc;"
| 46 || February 5, 1993 || Detroit
|-style="background:#cfc;"
| 47 || February 6, 19937:30 pm EST || @ Atlanta
| W 120–109
| Daugherty (28)
| Nance (11)
| Price (7)
| The Omni15,381
| 29–18
|-style="background:#cfc;"
| 48 || February 9, 1993 || @ Charlotte
|-style="background:#fcc;"
| 49 || February 10, 1993 || @ Orlando
|-style="background:#cfc;"
| 50 || February 12, 1993 || Milwaukee
|-style="background:#cfc;"
| 51 || February 13, 1993 || @ Chicago
|-style="background:#cfc;"
| 52 || February 15, 1993 || Indiana
|-style="background:#cfc;"
| 53 || February 17, 1993 || Dallas
|-style="background:#cfc;"
| 54 || February 23, 1993 || Miami
|-style="background:#cfc;"
| 55 || February 26, 1993 || @ L.A. Lakers
|-style="background:#cfc;"
| 56 || February 28, 1993 || @ Phoenix

|-style="background:#fcc;"
| 57 || March 2, 1993 || @ Seattle
|-style="background:#cfc;"
| 58 || March 4, 1993 || @ Minnesota
|-style="background:#fcc;"
| 59 || March 7, 1993 || @ Boston
|-style="background:#cfc;"
| 60 || March 8, 1993 || Denver
|-style="background:#cfc;"
| 61 || March 11, 1993 || Charlotte
|-style="background:#fcc;"
| 62 || March 15, 1993 || @ Washington
|-style="background:#cfc;"
| 63 || March 16, 1993 || Philadelphia
|-style="background:#fcc;"
| 64 || March 18, 1993 || New York
|-style="background:#fcc;"
| 65 || March 20, 1993 || @ Miami
|-style="background:#cfc;"
| 66 || March 23, 1993 || San Antonio
|-style="background:#cfc;"
| 67 || March 26, 1993 || @ Philadelphia
|-style="background:#fcc;"
| 68 || March 28, 1993 || @ Detroit

|-style="background:#fcc;"
| 69 || April 1, 1993 || @ New York
|-style="background:#fcc;"
| 70 || April 2, 1993 || @ Charlotte
|-style="background:#cfc;"
| 71 || April 4, 1993 || New Jersey
|-style="background:#cfc;"
| 72 || April 6, 1993 || Miami
|-style="background:#cfc;"
| 73 || April 9, 1993 || Washington
|-style="background:#cfc;"
| 74 || April 10, 1993 || @ New Jersey
|-style="background:#cfc;"
| 75 || April 13, 19937:30 pm EDT || @ Atlanta
| W 112–109 (2 OT)
| Price (24)
| Daugherty (17)
| Daugherty,Price (7)
| The Omni9,450
| 48–27
|-style="background:#cfc;"
| 76 || April 15, 1993 || @ Milwaukee
|-style="background:#cfc;"
| 77 || April 16, 1993 || Orlando
|-style="background:#cfc;"
| 78 || April 18, 1993 || Chicago
|-style="background:#cfc;"
| 79 || April 20, 1993 || Detroit
|-style="background:#cfc;"
| 80 || April 21, 1993 || @ Indiana
|-style="background:#fcc;"
| 81 || April 23, 1993 || @ Boston
|-style="background:#cfc;"
| 82 || April 25, 1993 || Philadelphia

Playoffs

|- align="center" bgcolor="#ccffcc"
| 1
| April 29
| New Jersey
| W 114–98
| Craig Ehlo (16)
| Brad Daugherty (14)
| Mark Price (7)
| Richfield Coliseum18,339
| 1–0
|- align="center" bgcolor="#ffcccc"
| 2
| May 1
| New Jersey
| L 99–101
| Price, Nance (17)
| Larry Nance (12)
| Mark Price (11)
| Richfield Coliseum20,273
| 1–1
|- align="center" bgcolor="#ccffcc"
| 3
| May 5
| @ New Jersey
| W 93–84
| Larry Nance (23)
| Larry Nance (17)
| Mark Price (4)
| Brendan Byrne Arena16,453
| 2–1
|- align="center" bgcolor="#ffcccc"
| 4
| May 7
| @ New Jersey
| L 79–96
| Brad Daugherty (29)
| four players tied (5)
| Mark Price (6)
| Brendan Byrne Arena15,238
| 2–2
|- align="center" bgcolor="#ccffcc"
| 1
| May 9
| New Jersey
| W 99–89
| Brad Daugherty (24)
| Brad Daugherty (20)
| Brad Daugherty (8)
| Richfield Coliseum17,388
| 3–2
|-

|- align="center" bgcolor="#ffcccc"
| 1
| May 11
| @ Chicago
| L 84–91
| Gerald Wilkins (19)
| Nance, Daugherty (8)
| Brad Daugherty (6)
| Chicago Stadium18,676
| 0–1
|- align="center" bgcolor="#ffcccc"
| 2
| May 13
| @ Chicago
| L 85–104
| Larry Nance (16)
| Nance, Daugherty (7)
| Mark Price (8)
| Chicago Stadium18,676
| 0–2
|- align="center" bgcolor="#ffcccc"
| 3
| May 15
| Chicago
| L 90–96
| Larry Nance (24)
| Brad Daugherty (11)
| three players tied (6)
| Richfield Coliseum20,273
| 0–3
|- align="center" bgcolor="#ffcccc"
| 4
| May 17
| Chicago
| L 101–103
| Brad Daugherty (25)
| Brad Daugherty (13)
| Wilkins, Price (6)
| Richfield Coliseum20,274
| 0–4
|-

Player statistics

Season

Playoffs

Player Statistics Citation:

Awards and records
 Mark Price, All-NBA First Team
 Larry Nance, NBA All-Defensive Second Team

Transactions

References

 Cleveland Cavaliers on Database Basketball

Cleveland Cavaliers seasons
Cleveland Cavaliers
Cleveland Cavaliers